Fowler Park and Cunningham Field is a baseball venue located on the campus of the University of San Diego in San Diego, California, United States.  It is home to the San Diego Toreros baseball team, a member of the Division I West Coast Conference.  The park was built in 2012-13 and has a capacity of 1,700 permanent seats, all of which are chair-backed.  Its capacity is able to expand to 3,000 spectators for postseason or special event play.  The stadium was designed by Populous.

History

The stadium is named after Ron and Alexis Fowler who provided a substantial portion of the $13 million needed to build the ballpark.  The field, like its predecessor, is named for former San Diego baseball coach John Cunningham.  Cunningham was the Torero head coach for 34 seasons.

Fowler Park opened on February 15, 2013, hosting a 3-game series between University of San Diego and their cross town opponents from San Diego State University.

The field is located at 5998 Alcala Park, San Diego, California, on the site previously occupied by its predecessor John Cunningham Stadium.

Features
Fowler Park features a grand entry archway detailed in 16th century Spanish Renaissance architecture that connects the ballpark with nearby campus architecture. Seating capacity is expandable from 1,700 to 3,000 during NCAA Regionals and Super Regionals with views to the west of Mission Bay and the Pacific Ocean. The stadium also features a 25'x16' digital ICG scoreboard, clubhouse for players and coaches which includes a spacious locker room, player study lounge, coaches' offices, athletic training room, conference room, soft-toss area and mud room. Luxury suites for fans are also available, as well as a press box area for radio/TV/game operations, public restrooms, concessions and ticket office.

See also
 List of NCAA Division I baseball venues

References

College baseball venues in the United States
Baseball venues in California
Sports venues in San Diego
San Diego Toreros baseball
Sports venues completed in 2013
2013 establishments in California